Short-term energy-relieving behavior (STERB) is continuously repeated, sometimes involuntary or compulsive, behavior for releasing the build-up of energy caused by unresolved emotions or trauma. 

Examples of common STERBs are overeating, substance and alcohol use, excessive exercise, social isolation, sex, fantasies, shopping and workaholism. Most of these actions are not harmful in and of themselves, but they do not provide a long-term resolution of the emotional pain, and may even lead to damaging consequences in the long run. 

Treatment of grief through self-medication and STERBs can hide the normal and natural reactions to loss and will only delay and obstruct the natural process of grief, making it more difficult to reconnect those feelings later.

See also 
 Self-medication
 Grief counseling
 Addiction psychology
 Behavioral addiction
 Twelve-step program

References

Further reading 
 

Behaviorism